Jean-Baptiste Fritzson (born 4 January 1986) is a Haitian footballer who plays as a striker for Morris Elite SC.

Career
Born in Delmas, Haiti, Jean-Baptiste Fritzson started his career with the youth setup of local club Aigle Noir AC. After several years with the first team of Aigle Noir AC in January 2009 he went on trial at Montreal Impact and New York Red Bulls.

On 17 May 2010, the New England Revolution of Major League Soccer announced that Fritzson would join the team on trial. He started for the team in a friendly match against Benfica on 18 May.

For the 2011 season Fritzon played college soccer for Essex County College. In his one year with the Wolverines he appeared in 6 matches scoring 9 goals and providing 2 assists.

On 22 September 2020, it was announced that Fritzon would be joining Morris Elite SC for the clubs inaugural season in USL 2.

International
Fitzson is a former Haitian under-21 international, having appeared in seven games and scoring one goal at that level. In 2006 he played his first match with the senior national team. He also played with his country the under-23 qualification matches for the Beijing Olympic Games.

Honours
Haiti
 Caribbean Cup: 2007

External links

Haitiwebs.com Player Profile

References

1986 births
Living people
Haitian footballers
Haiti international footballers
Association football forwards
Essex County College alumni
Haiti youth international footballers
Aigle Noir AC players
People from Ouest (department)
Haitian expatriate footballers
Expatriate soccer players in the United States
Haitian expatriate sportspeople in the United States
Morris Elite SC players
Lansdowne Yonkers FC players